The Bengali script or Bangla alphabet (Bangla bôrṇômala) is the alphabet used to write the Bengali language based on the Bengali-Assamese script, and has historically been used to write Sanskrit within Bengal. It is one of the most widely adopted writing systems in the world (used by over 265 million people).

From a classificatory point of view, the Bengali writing system is an abugida, i.e. its vowel graphemes are mainly realised not as independent letters, but as diacritics modifying the vowel inherent in the base letter they are added to. It is written from left to right and uses a single letter case, which makes it a unicameral script, as opposed to a bicameral one like the Latin script. It is recognisable, as are some other Brahmic scripts, by a distinctive horizontal line known as a mātrā running along the tops of the letters that links them together. The Bengali writing system is less blocky, however, and presents a more sinuous shape than the Devanagari script.

It is one of the official scripts of the Indian Republic. It is used as the official script of Bengali language in Bangladesh and West Bengal as well as Meitei language in Manipur (officially termed as "Manipuri language"), two of the official languages of India.

Characters 
The Bengali script can be divided into vowels and vowel diacritics, consonants and consonant conjuncts, diacritical and other symbols, digits and punctuation marks. Vowels and consonants are used as letters and also as diacritical marks.

Vowels 
The Bengali script has a total of 9 vowel graphemes, each of which is called a  swôrôbôrnô "vowel letter". The swôrôbôrnôs represent six of the seven main vowel sounds of Bengali, along with two vowel diphthongs. All of them are used in both Bengali and Assamese languages.
 "" ô ( shôrô ô, "vocalic ô")  sounds as the default inherent vowel for the entire Bengali script. Bengali, Assamese and Odia which are Eastern languages have this value for the inherent vowel, while other languages using Brahmic scripts have a for their inherent vowel.
 Even though the near-open front unrounded vowel  is one of the seven main vowel sounds in the standard Bengali language, no distinct vowel symbol has been allotted for it in the script since there is no  sound in Sanskrit, the primary written language when the script was conceived. As a result, the sound is orthographically realised by multiple means in modern Bengali orthography, usually using some combination of "" e ( shôrô e, "vocalic e") , "", "" a ( shôrô a)  and the  jôphôla (diacritic form of the consonant grapheme  jô).
 There are two graphemes for the vowel sound  and two graphemes for the vowel sound . The redundancy stems from the time when this script was used to write Sanskrit, a language that had short and long vowels: "" i ( rôshshô i, "short i")  and "" ī (দীর্ঘ ঈ dirghô ī, "long ī") , and "" u (হ্রস্ব উ rôshshô u)  and "" ū (দীর্ঘ ঊ dirghô ū) . The letters are preserved in the Bengali script with their traditional names despite the fact that they are no longer pronounced differently in ordinary speech. These graphemes serve an etymological function, however, in preserving the original Sanskrit spelling in tôtsômô Bengali words (words borrowed from Sanskrit).
 The grapheme called "" ṛ (or হ্রস্ব ঋ rôshshô ri, "short ri", as it used to be) does not really represent a vowel phoneme in Bengali but the consonant-vowel combination  . Nevertheless, it is included in the vowel section of the inventory of the Bengali script. This inconsistency is also a remnant from Sanskrit, where the grapheme represents the vocalic equivalent of a retroflex approximant (possibly an r-colored vowel). Another grapheme called "" ḷ (or হ্রস্ব ঌ rôshshô li as it used to be) representing the vocalic equivalent of a dental approximant in Sanskrit but actually representing the consonant-vowel combination   in Bengali instead of a vowel phoneme, was also included in the vowel section but unlike "", it was recently discarded from the inventory since its usage was extremely limited even in Sanskrit.
 When a vowel sound occurs syllable-initially or when it follows another vowel, it is written using a distinct letter. When a vowel sound follows a consonant (or a consonant cluster), it is written with a diacritic which, depending on the vowel, can appear above, below, before or after the consonant. These vowel marks cannot appear without a consonant and are called  kar.
 An exception to the above system is the vowel , which has no vowel mark but is considered inherent in every consonant letter. To denote the absence of the inherent vowel  following a consonant, a diacritic called the  hôsôntô (্) may be written underneath the consonant.
 Although there are only two diphthongs in the inventory of the script: "" oi (স্বর ঐ shôrô oi, "vocalic oi")  and "" ou (স্বর ঔ shôrô ou) , the Bengali phonetic system has, in fact, many diphthongs. Most diphthongs are represented by juxtaposing the graphemes of their constituent vowels, as in  keu .
 There also used to be two long vowels: "" ṝ (দীর্ঘ ৠ dirghô rri, "long rri") and "" ḹ (দীর্ঘ ৡ dirghô lli), which were removed from the inventory during the Vidyasagarian reform of the script due to peculiarity to Sanskrit.

The table below shows the vowels present in the modern (since the late nineteenth century) inventory of the Bengali alphabet:

Notes

Consonants 
Consonant letters are called  bænjônbôrnô "consonant letter" in Bengali. The names of the letters are typically just the consonant sound plus the inherent vowel  ô. Since the inherent vowel is assumed and not written, most letters' names look identical to the letter itself (the name of the letter  is itself ghô, not gh).

 Some letters that have lost their distinctive pronunciation in modern Bengali are called by more elaborate names. What was once pronounced and written as a retroflex nasal ণ  is now pronounced as an alveolar  (unless conjoined with another retroflex consonant such as ট, ঠ, ড and ঢ) although the spelling does not reflect the change.
 Although still named murdhônyô when they are being taught, retroflex consonants do not exist in Bengali and are instead fronted to their postalveolar and alveolar equivalents.
 Post-reform, the letter য় was introduced to distinguish it from য [note]:
 The semivowel  yô  cannot occur at the beginning of a word . The name of য় is  ôntôsthô ô ('semi-vowel y') [the y is silent in the pronunciation of its name]. The pronunciation of  yô  varies between ⟨w⟩ and ⟨j⟩ ['w' and 'y']. 
It is found almost entirely at the beginning of words. 
 When present in the middle of words, in conjuncts, য is represented as a distinct letter:  (যফলা jôphôla) which is mostly silent or semi-silent (see below). Jôphôla may alter the pronunciation of the surrounding vowel or double the preceding consonant or be completely silent.
 Since the nasals  ñô  and  ngô  cannot occur at the beginning of a word in Bengali, their names are not ñô and ngô respectively but  ungô (pronounced by some as  umô or  ũô) and  iñô (pronounced by some as  niyô or  ingô)  respectively.
 There is a difference in the pronunciation of  ṛô ( ḍô-e shunyô ṛô, "ṛô (as) ḍô with a zero (the figure is used analogous to the ring below diacritic as the Bengali equivalent of the Devanagari nuqta, which is again analogous to the underdot)") and  ṛhô ( ḍhô-e shunyô ṛhô) with that of   rô (sometimes called  bô-e shunyô rô for distinguishing purpose) - similar to other Indic languages. It is an allophonic development in some Indic languages not present in Sanskrit.

Notes

Consonant conjuncts

Clusters of up to four consonants can be orthographically represented as a typographic ligature called a consonant conjunct ( juktakkhôr/juktôbôrnô or more specifically ). Typically, the first consonant in the conjunct is shown above and/or to the left of the following consonants. Many consonants appear in an abbreviated or compressed form when serving as part of a conjunct. Others simply take exceptional forms in conjuncts, bearing little or no resemblance to the base character.

Often, consonant conjuncts are not actually pronounced as would be implied by the pronunciation of the individual components. For example, adding  lô underneath  shô in Bengali creates the conjunct , which is not pronounced shlô but slô in Bengali. It is a combination of  ǰô and  ñô but it is not pronounced "ǰñô" or "jnô". Instead, it is pronounced ggô in modern Bengali. Thus, as conjuncts often represent (combinations of) sounds that cannot be easily understood from the components, the following descriptions are concerned only with the construction of the conjunct, and not the resulting pronunciation.

(Some graphemes may appear in a form other than the mentioned form due to the font used)

Fused forms
Some consonants fuse in such a way that one stroke of the first consonant also serves as a stroke of the next.
 The consonants can be placed on top of one another, sharing their vertical line:  kkô  gnô  glô  nnô  pnô  ppô  llô etc.
 As the last member of a conjunct, ব bô can hang on the vertical line under the preceding consonants, taking the shape of ব bô (includes বফলা bôphôla):  gbô  "ṇbô"  "dbô"  lbô  "shbô".
 The consonants can also be placed side-by-side, sharing their vertical line:  ddô  ndô  bdô  bǰô  pṭô  sṭô  shchô  shchhô, etc.

Approximated forms
Some consonants are written closer to one another simply to indicate that they are in a conjunct together.
 The consonants can be placed side-by-side, appearing unaltered:  dgô  dghô  ḍḍô.
 As the last member of a conjunct,  bô can appear immediately to the right of the preceding consonant, taking the shape of  bô (includes বফলা bôphôla):  "dhbô"  bbô  "hbô".

Compressed forms
Some consonants are compressed (and often simplified) when appearing as the first member of a conjunct.
 As the first member of a conjunct, the consonants  ngô  chô  ḍô and  bô are often compressed and placed at the top-left of the following consonant, with little or no change to the basic shape:  "ngkṣô"  ngkhô  ngghô  ngmô  chchô  chchhô  "chnô"  ḍḍhô  bbô.
 As the first member of a conjunct,  tô is compressed and placed above the following consonant, with little or no change to the basic shape:  tnô  "tmô"  "tbô".
 As the first member of a conjunct,  mô is compressed and simplified to a curved shape. It is placed above or to the top-left of the following consonant:  mnô  mpô  mfô  mbô  mbhô  mmô  mlô.
 As the first member of a conjunct,  ṣô is compressed and simplified to an oval shape with a diagonal stroke through it. It is placed to the top-left of the following consonants:  ṣkô  ṣṭô  ṣṭhô  ṣpô  ṣfô  ṣmô.
 As the first member of a conjunct,  sô is compressed and simplified to a ribbon shape. It is placed above or to the top-left of the following consonant:  skô  skhô  stô  sthô  snô  spô  sfô  "sbô"  "smô"  slô.

Abbreviated forms
Some consonants are abbreviated when appearing in conjuncts and lose part of their basic shape.
 As the first member of a conjunct,  ǰô can lose its final down-stroke:  ǰǰô  "ǰñô"  "jbô".
 As the first member of a conjunct,  ñô can lose its bottom half:  ñchô  ñchhô  ñǰô  ñǰhô.
 As the last member of a conjunct,  ñô can lose its left half (the  part):  "ǰñô".
 As the first member of a conjunct,  ṇô and  pô can lose their down-stroke:  ṇṭhô  ṇḍô  ptô  psô.
 As the first member of a conjunct,  tô and  bhô can lose their final upward tail:  ttô  tthô  trô  bhrô.
 As the last member of a conjunct,  thô can lose its final upstroke, taking the form of  hô instead:  nthô  sthô  mthô
 As the last member of a conjunct,  mô can lose its initial down-stroke:  "kmô"  "gmô"  ngmô  "ṭmô"  "ṇmô"  "tmô"  "dmô"  nmô  mmô  "shmô"  ṣmô  "smô".
 As the last member of a conjunct,  sô can lose its top half:  ksô.
 As the last member of a conjunct  ṭô,  ḍô and  ḍhô can lose their matra:  pṭô  ṇḍô  ṇṭô  ṇḍhô.
 As the last member of a conjunct  ḍô can change its shape:  ṇḍô

Variant forms
Some consonants have forms that are used regularly but only within conjuncts.
 As the first member of a conjunct, ঙ ngô can appear as a loop and curl: ঙ্ক ngkô ঙ্গ nggô.
 As the last member of a conjunct, the curled top of ধ dhô is replaced by a straight downstroke to the right, taking the form of ঝ ǰhô instead: গ্ধ gdhô দ্ধ ddhô ন্ধ ndhô ব্ধ bdhô.
 As the first member of a conjunct, র rô appears as a diagonal stroke (called রেফ ref) above the following member: র্ক rkô র্খ rkhô র্গ rgô র্ঘ rghô, etc.
 As the last member of a conjunct, র rô appears as a wavy horizontal line (called রফলা rôphôla) under the previous member: খ্র khrô গ্র grô ঘ্র ghrô ব্র brô, etc.
 In some fonts, certain conjuncts with রফলা rôphôla appear using the compressed (and often simplified) form of the previous consonant: জ্র ǰrô ট্র ṭrô ঠ্র ṭhrô ড্র ḍrô ম্র mrô স্র srô.
 In some fonts, certain conjuncts with রফলা rôphôla appear using the abbreviated form of the previous consonant: ক্র krô ত্র trô ভ্র bhrô.
 As the last member of a conjunct, য jô appears as a wavy vertical line (called যফলা jôphôla) to the right of the previous member: ক্য "kyô" খ্য "khyô" গ্য "gyô" ঘ্য "ghyô" etc.
 In some fonts, certain conjuncts with যফলা jôphôla appear using special fused forms: দ্য "dyô" ন্য "nyô" শ্য "shyô" ষ্য "ṣyô" স্য "syô" হ্য "hyô".

Exceptions
 When followed by র rô or ত tô, ক kô takes on the same form as ত tô would with the addition of a curl to the right: ক্র krô, ক্ত ktô.
 When preceded by the abbreviated form of ঞ ñô, চ chô takes the shape of ব bô: ঞ্চ ñchô
 When preceded by another ট ṭô, ট is reduced to a leftward curl: ট্ট ṭṭô.
 When preceded by ষ ṣô, ণ ṇô appears as two loops to the right: ষ্ণ ṣṇô.
 As the first member of a conjunct, or when at the end of a word and followed by no vowel, ত tô can appear as ৎ: ৎস "tsô" ৎপ tpô ৎক tkô etc.
 When preceded by হ hô, ন nô appears as a curl to the right: হ্ন "hnô".
 Certain combinations must be memorised: ক্ষ "kṣô" হ্ম "hmô".

Certain compounds

When serving as a vowel mark, উ u, ঊ u, and ঋ ri take on many exceptional forms.
 উ u
 When following গ gô or শ shô, it takes on a variant form resembling the final tail of ও o: গু gu শু shu.
 When following a ত tô that is already part of a conjunct with প pô, ন nô or স sô, it is fused with the ত to resemble ও o: ন্তু ntu স্তু stu প্তু ptu.
 When following র rô, and in many fonts also following the variant রফলা rôphôla, it appears as an upward curl to the right of the preceding consonant as opposed to a downward loop below: রু ru গ্রু gru ত্রু tru থ্রু thru দ্রু dru ধ্রু dhru ব্রু bru ভ্রু bhru শ্রু shru.
 When following হ hô, it appears as an extra curl: হু hu.
 ঊ u
 When following র rô, and in many fonts also following the variant রফলা rôphôla, it appears as a downstroke to the right of the preceding consonant as opposed to a downward hook below: রূ rū গ্রূ grū থ্রূ thrū দ্রূ drū ধ্রূ dhrū ভ্রূ bhrū শ্রূ shrū.
 ঋ ri
 When following হ hô, it takes the variant shape of ঊ u: হৃ hri.
 Conjuncts of three consonants also exist, and follow the same rules as above: স sô + ত tô +র rô = স্ত্র strô, ম mô + প pô + র rô = ম্প্র mprô, জ ǰô + জ ǰô + ব bô = জ্জ্ব "ǰǰbô", ক্ষ "kṣô" + ম mô = ক্ষ্ম "kṣmô".
 Theoretically, four-consonant conjuncts can also be created, as in র rô + স sô + ট ṭô + র rô = র্স্ট্র rsṭrô, but they are not found in native words.
 Also theoretically, 5-letter conjuncts can be created, as র rô + স sô + ট tô + র rô + ঁ = র্স্ট্রঁ (pronounced rsṭrô but nasalised: rsṭrôñ). Here ঁ is a diacritic which nasalises the previous vowel. A theoretical 6-letter conjunct would be র্স্ট্রাঁ (rsṭrañ/rsṭra), with the addition of a (আ) to র্স্ট্রঁ, and a theoretical 7-letter conjunct would be like র্স্ট্র‍্যাঁ (rsṭrya/rsṭryañ) with the addition of য to র্স্ট্রাঁ.

Diacritics and other symbols
These are mainly the Brahmi-Sanskrit diacritics, phones and punctuation marks present in languages with Sanskrit influence or Brahmi-derived scripts.

Notes

Digits and numerals

The Bengali script has ten numerical digits (graphemes or symbols indicating the numbers from 0 to 9). Bengali numerals have no horizontal headstroke or মাত্রা "matra".

Numbers larger than 9 are written in Bengali using a positional base 10 numeral system (the decimal system). A period or dot is used to denote the decimal separator, which separates the integral and the fractional parts of a decimal number. When writing large numbers with many digits, commas are used as delimiters to group digits, indicating the thousand (হাজার hazar), the hundred thousand or lakh (লাখ lakh or লক্ষ lôkkhô), and the ten million or hundred lakh or crore (কোটি koti) units. In other words, leftwards from the decimal separator, the first grouping consists of three digits, and the subsequent groupings always consist of two digits.

For example, the English number 17,557,345 will be written in traditional Bengali as ১,৭৫,৫৭,৩৪৫.

Punctuation marks
Bengali punctuation marks, apart from the downstroke দাড়ি dari (।), the Bengali equivalent of a full stop, have been adopted from western scripts and their usage is similar: Commas, semicolons, colons, quotation marks, etc. are the same as in English. Capital letters are absent in the Bengali script so proper names are unmarked.An apostrophe, known in Bengali as ঊর্ধ্বকমা urdhbôkôma "upper comma", is sometimes used to distinguish between homographs, as in পাটা pata "plank" and পাʼটা pa'ta "the leg". Sometimes, a hyphen is used for the same purpose (as in পা-টা, an alternative of পাʼটা).

Characteristics of the Bengali text

Bengali text is written and read horizontally, from left to right. The consonant graphemes and the full form of vowel graphemes fit into an imaginary rectangle of uniform size (uniform width and height). The size of a consonant conjunct, regardless of its complexity, is deliberately maintained the same as that of a single consonant grapheme, so that diacritic vowel forms can be attached to it without any distortion. In a typical Bengali text, orthographic words, words as they are written, can be seen as being separated from each other by an even spacing. Graphemes within a word are also evenly spaced, but that spacing is much narrower than the spacing between words.

Unlike in western scripts (Latin, Cyrillic, etc.) for which the letter-forms stand on an invisible baseline, the Bengali letter-forms instead hang from a visible horizontal left-to-right headstroke called মাত্রা matra. The presence and absence of this matra can be important. For example, the letter ত tô and the numeral ৩ "3" are distinguishable only by the presence or absence of the matra, as is the case between the consonant cluster ত্র trô and the independent vowel এ e. The letter-forms also employ the concepts of letter-width and letter-height (the vertical space between the visible matra and an invisible baseline).

According to Bengali linguist Munier Chowdhury, there are about nine graphemes that are the most frequent in Bengali texts, shown with its percentage of appearance in the adjacent table.

Comparison of Bengali script with ancestral and related scripts

Vowels

Consonants

Vowel diacritics

Standardization

In the script, clusters of consonants are represented by different and sometimes quite irregular forms; thus, learning to read is complicated by the sheer size of the full set of letters and letter combinations, numbering about 350. While efforts at standardising the alphabet for the Bengali language continue in such notable centres as the Bangla Academy at Dhaka (Bangladesh) and the Pôshchimbônggô Bangla Akademi at Kolkata (West Bengal, India), it is still not quite uniform yet, as many people continue to use various archaic forms of letters, resulting in concurrent forms for the same sounds.

Romanization

Romanization of Bengali is the representation of the Bengali language in the Latin script. There are various ways of Romanization systems of Bengali, created in recent years but failed to represent the true Bengali phonetic sound. While different standards for romanisation have been proposed for Bengali, they have not been adopted with the degree of uniformity seen in languages such as Japanese or Sanskrit. The Bengali alphabet has often been included with the group of Brahmic scripts for romanisation in which the true phonetic value of Bengali is never represented. Some of them are the International Alphabet of Sanskrit Transliteration or "IAST system" "Indian languages Transliteration" or ITRANS (uses upper case alphabets suited for ASCII keyboards), and the extension of IAST intended for non-Sanskrit languages of the Indian region called the National Library at Kolkata romanisation.

Sample texts
Article 1 of the Universal Declaration of Human Rights

The first line is the Bengali alphabet; the second a phonetic Romanization, the third IPA.

Unicode

Bengali script was added to the Unicode Standard in October 1991 with the release of version 1.0.

The Unicode block for Bengali is U+0980–U+09FF:

See also
 Bengali Braille
 Robert B. Wray movable type for Bengali (1778)
 Bengali phonology

Notes

References

Bibliography
 
 
 
 
 
  
 
 

Bengali script
Alphabet
Languages of Bangladesh
Officially used writing systems of India